Joseph Rosa Merszei (born 6 April 1974 in Hong Kong) is an auto racing driver from Macau.

Career history

Early years
Merszei competed in touring car racing in Asia-Pacific and Hong Kong championships between 1991 and 1996. He has since competed in many open wheel racing series in Asia and competed in the Formula Three Macau Grand Prix every year between 1999 and 2007, with a best finish of 12th in 2001.

World Touring Car Championship
He made his World Touring Car Championship debut for Liqui Moly Team Engstler at the 2009 Guia Race of Macau He again drove for the team in 2010 and 2011 Macau races. He returned to the team for the 2012 Guia Race of Macau, racing the car previously driven by Alex Liu.

Racing record

Complete World Touring Car Championship results
(key) (Races in bold indicate pole position) (Races in italics indicate fastest lap)

References

External links
 Driver Database stats
 WTCC Driver Profile

Living people
1974 births
Macau racing drivers
Asian Formula Three Championship drivers
Formula V6 Asia drivers
Asian Formula Renault Challenge drivers
World Touring Car Championship drivers
Hong Kong emigrants to Macau

Alan Docking Racing drivers
Cram Competition drivers
Carlin racing drivers
Engstler Motorsport drivers